The Philippines national American football team or the Philippines national tackle football team, represents the Philippines in international American football competitions. The team is under the American Tackle Football Federation of the Philippines (ATFFP), which was founded by Bernaro “Dodi” Palma II in 2009.

History

Early history
American Football has been in the Philippines since as early as 2001,  with the flag football variant being introduced first. A flag football league was established, with its teams defeating other teams from China and Singapore. Around 2010, tackle football was introduced with a league on the standard variant of football being established by then. An international club team called the Philippine Punishers was formed which defeated teams from China, Hong Kong, and Saipan.

Debut as the Philippine Aguilas

In 2014, the first official national tackle football team, which was called Philippine Aguilas, was organized. They made their first official international debut at the 2015 IFAF World Championship – Asian Qualifier Game against Japan on April 26, 2014. The Philippines was defeated by Japan on their first game with the score 0-86.

The Philippines hosted their first ever international friendly at home against the Western Australian Raiders of the Australian Gridiron League. The national team lost the match held at the Emperador Stadium by 7–56. In 2015, the team organized a friendly match against the Korea Tigers, a team bannered by the Korea University. The Aguilas lost to the Tigers, with the close scoreline of 33–38.

Aguila All-Star era
The national team is funded by its players, not by the government. It occasionally receives funds from sponsors. In 2016, a non-profit Player's Association was formed by players, which are part of teams that were part of ArenaBall Philippines such as the Bandits, Knights, Renegades, Wolves, and the Vanguards, as well as from other leagues such as the Templars and the Neros which were newly formed by the time of the association's establishment. This association uses its funds for international games, a free league and for charity events. The core of the national team is composed of players from this association and has adopted the moniker "All-Star Aguilas". This team is also known as the "Aguila All-Stars"

All-Star Aguilas won their first match against an international opposition when they won over the Korean Tigers at their second meeting at the PHIL-KOR Cup in February 2016.

Fixtures and results

IFAF World Championship record

Coaches

References

External links
Official Facebook Page

Men's national American football teams
American football
American football in the Philippines